An electric trike is a three-wheeled vehicle powered by an electric motor.

Overview

Definition

While the normal legal definition of motorcycle is a two-wheeled vehicle, in the USA a motorcycle may also be three-wheeled. This classification does not depend on whether the operator is fully enclosed by a "cage" or exposed to the elements.

Electric trikes have become increasingly popular in the last few years due to their versatility and the convenience they offer. They are available in a variety of sizes, some of which are designed for recreational purposes while others can be used as a form of alternative transportation. An electric tricycle is ideal for those that want to get around in an eco-friendly way and yet still require more stability than a regular bicycle can provide. Aside from being easy to ride, many models feature powerful motors, large batteries and even headlights or other accessories depending on your needs - making them great for commuters who need something sturdy that can travel long distances without putting a strain on the environment. As such, electric trikes are a fantastic solution for those looking for an efficient and sustainable mode of transport.

Configurations

Three-wheeled vehicles with one front wheel and two rear wheels are known as a delta design or the traditional trike (tricycle) design, while vehicles with two front wheels and one rear wheel are known as a tadpole design.

Electric assisted velomobiles

Some three-wheeled electric vehicles, such as the Twike and the Myers Motors NmG, enclose the rider in a cabin or cockpit.

References

Electric vehicles
Electric three-wheel vehicles
Tricycles
Micromobility